Septembers of Shiraz is a 2015 American drama film directed by Wayne Blair and written by Hanna Weg. It is based on the 2007 novel The Septembers of Shiraz by Dalia Sofer. The film stars Adrien Brody, Salma Hayek, Shohreh Aghdashloo, Anthony Azizi, Bashar Rahal and Alon Aboutboul. The film was released on June 24, 2016, by Momentum Pictures.

Plot
During the first months after the 1979 Iranian Revolution, wealthy Jewish Iranian gemologist Isaac Amin (Adrien Brody) is suddenly arrested at his office in Tehran by the Revolutionary Guards who take him to prison. During his prison days, he meets fellow prisoners of different backgrounds, who are tortured and finally prosecuted. In interrogation sessions, his interrogator Mohsen (Alon Aboutboul), once torturing him with a lit cigarette and having him lashed, refers to the injustice of being affluent and to the justice that the revolution is bringing to the oppressed. After the guards scare him by putting him before a firing squad and shooting around his body, he says to Mohsen that he is ready to pay all his savings to the new Islamic regime in order to have a chance at freedom. After emptying his bank account, Mohsen declares him free and leaves him alone in the street.

Isaac goes to his office, now deserted, and recovers a hidden pack of diamonds from behind a brick in the wall. As he prepares to leave, he sees Morteza (Navid Navid), a former employee of the office and son of their housekeeper (Shohreh Aghdashloo), who has already directed the stealing of his gems and office equipment, wandering in the corridor. Morteza asks for more and shows him a letter of compliment that Shahbanu Farah Pahlavi had written to him, to blackmail him. Isaac tells him that he is now a contributor to the revolution and can eliminate Morteza by a single phone call. Morteza leaves. Isaac refers to a human smuggler and pays him the diamond so he will smuggle them out of Iran. In the meantime, Morteza gives the letter to Mohsen at a Revolutionary Guards office but was arrested in turn. When alone, Mohsen reflects over the letter and burns it. In a night journey on horseback and through forest, Isaac and his family make it to the other side of the border to Turkey.

Cast
Adrien Brody as Isaac Amin 
Salma Hayek as Farnaz
Shohreh Aghdashloo as Habibeh
Anthony Azizi as Mehdi
Bashar Rahal as Komiteh Member
Alon Aboutboul as Mohsen
Wadih Dona as Rostam
Nasser Memarzia as Mansoor
Navid Navid as Morteza
Velislav Pavlov as Hossein
Jamie Ward as Parviz Amin
Ariana Molkara as Shirin

Production
On February 7, 2014, Salma Hayek and Shohreh Aghdashloo joined the cast. On April 9, 2014, Adrien Brody joined the cast. Principal photography began on June 9, 2014. The film was shot in Bulgaria.

Release
The film premiered at the 2015 Toronto International Film Festival on September 15, 2015. It was selected as the opening night film for the San Diego International Film Festival on September 30, 2015. The film was released on June 24, 2016, by Momentum Pictures.

Reception
Septembers of Shiraz received middling to negative reviews from critics. On Rotten Tomatoes, the film has an approval rating of 31%, based on 13 reviews, with an average rating of 4.20/10. On Metacritic, the film has a score of 16 out of 100, based on 5 critics, indicating overwhelming dislike.

References

External links
 

2015 films
American drama films
2015 drama films
Iranian Revolution films
Films directed by Wayne Blair
Films shot in Bulgaria
Films set in Iran
Films set in Tehran
Films set in 1979
2010s English-language films
2010s American films